Apiloscatopse scutellata  is a species of fly in the family Scatopsidae. It is found in the  Palearctic .

References

External links
 Images representing Scatopsidae at BOLD
 Bioimages images of Apiloscatopse scutellata 

Scatopsidae
Insects described in 1846
Nematoceran flies of Europe
Taxa named by Hermann Loew